The Makarska Riviera is a part of the Croatian coast of the Adriatic Sea, about 60 kilometers (37.2 miles) long and only several kilometers wide, squeezed under towering mountain Biokovo. Sunny climate and long pebbly beaches make this region a popular tourist destination. A string of settlements along the coast from the border with Omiš coast on northwest to Neretva Delta on the southeast:

 Brela (population 1,618 according to 2001 census)
 Baška Voda (2,045)
 Promajna (456)
 Krvavica (287)
 Bratuš (-)
 Bast (136)
 Makarska, the center of the region (13,716)
 Tučepi (1,763)
 Podgora (1,534)
 Drašnice (328)
 Igrane (480)
 Živogošće (538)
 Drvenik (500)
 Zaostrog (372)
 Podaca (716)
 Brist (453)
 Gradac (1,574)

See also
Riviera, featuring links to articles on the many coastal strips around the world which are known as Riviera

Geography of Split-Dalmatia County
Tourism in Croatia